Ashcott is a small village and civil parish located in the Sedgemoor area of Somerset in the south-west of England.  The village has a population of 1,186. The parish includes the hamlets of Ashcott Corner, Berhill, Buscott, Nythe and Pedwell.

The village has five pubs and its own brewer, Moor Beer.   It has a church, shop, a primary school and an all-through independent school.

The annual Ashcott BeerFest is held on the Coronation playing fields at the end of June/beginning of July each year. It raises money for the Playing Fields, Cheeky Chimps Pre-School and the Ashcott Primary School PTA.

History

The parish of Ashcott was part of the Whitley Hundred.

The village was a stop for mail coaches running from Bath to Exeter, and later had a station on the Evercreech Junction to Burnham-on-Sea branch of the Somerset and Dorset Joint Railway. The station was two miles away from the village, and was originally called "Ashcott and Meare", reflecting the fact that Meare was also nearby (in fact, nearer). "Meare" was dropped from the official name in 1876, though the station "running board" – the large sign on the platform – continued to give the double name until the railway line closed in 1966 under the Beeching Axe.

A narrow gauge railway operated by Eclipse Peat operated from 1922 to 1983 and crossed the branch line on the level about 1/2-mile east of Ashcott station. On 29 August 1949 a train on the branch collided with a narrow gauge engine and the locomotive ended up in the adjacent Glastonbury Canal.

Governance

The parish council has responsibility for local issues, including setting an annual precept (local rate) to cover the council's operating costs and producing annual accounts for public scrutiny. The parish council evaluates local planning applications and works with the local police, district council officers, and neighbourhood watch groups on matters of crime, security, and traffic. The parish council's role also includes initiating projects for the maintenance and repair of parish facilities, as well as consulting with the district council on the maintenance, repair, and improvement of highways, drainage, footpaths, public transport, and street cleaning. Conservation matters (including trees and listed buildings) and environmental issues are also the responsibility of the council.

The village falls within the Non-metropolitan district of Sedgemoor, which was formed on 1 April 1974 under the Local Government Act 1972, having previously been part of Bridgwater Rural District, which is responsible for local planning and building control, local roads, council housing, environmental health, markets and fairs, refuse collection and recycling, cemeteries and crematoria, leisure services, parks, and tourism.

Somerset County Council is responsible for running the largest and most expensive local services such as education, social services, libraries, main roads, public transport, policing and fire services, trading standards, waste disposal and strategic planning.

The village is part of 'East Polden' electoral ward. Although Ashcott is the most populous area the ward stretches to Moorlinch and Shapwick. The total population of the ward at the 2011 census was 2,130.

It is also part of the Bridgwater and West Somerset county constituency represented in the House of Commons of the Parliament of the United Kingdom. It elects one Member of Parliament (MP) by the first past the post system of election.

Religious sites

The Anglican parish Church of All Saints dates from the 15th century and has been designated as a Grade II* listed building.

Notable residents

Ashcott was the birthplace of Joseph Trutch, a Canadian engineer, surveyor and politician. It is also the home to Bradley Middleton, former professional footballer and founder of The Levels School.

References

External links

Ashcott Village Website
Ashcott primary school
The Levels School website , based in Ashcott 
Ashcott BeerFest

Sedgemoor DC - Ashcott Parish Boundary

Villages in Sedgemoor
Civil parishes in Somerset